Anne Frank School or Anne Frank Elementary School may refer to:
 Germany
 
 
 
 
 
 
 
 
 Netherlands
 6th Montessori School Anne Frank
 United States
 Anne Frank Elementary School in Dallas
 Anne Frank Elementary School in Philadelphia